The Tiger Lily is a 1919 American silent drama film directed by George L. Cox and starring Margarita Fischer and Emory Johnson.

Plot

Cast
{| 
! style="width: 180px; text-align: left;" |  Actor
! style="width: 230px; text-align: left;" |  Role
|- style="text-align: left;"
|Margarita Fischer||Carmina
|-
|Emory Johnson||David Remington
|-
|George Periolat||Luigi
|-
|E. Alyn Warren||Giovanni
|-
|J. Barney Sherry||Philip Remington
|-
|Rosita Marstini||Mrs. Philip Remington
|-
|Beatrice Van||Dorothy Van Rensselaer
|-
|Frank Clark||Antonio
|-
|}

References

External links

American silent feature films
American black-and-white films
Silent American drama films
Films with screenplays by Joseph F. Poland
Films directed by George L. Cox
1910s English-language films
1910s American films
1919 drama films